Bulkhead may refer to:

Structural safety devices
Bulkhead (partition), a wall within the hull of a ship, vehicle, or container
Torpedo bulkhead, a type of armor plate or protective covering    designed to keep a ship afloat even if the hull is struck by a shell or by a torpedo
Bulkhead (barrier), a retaining wall used as a form of coastal management, akin to a seawall, or as a structural device such as a bulkhead partition
Bulkhead door, an angled door covering the exterior stairwell of a basement
Bulkhead flatcar, a type of rolling stock designed with sturdy end-walls to prevent loads from shifting past the ends of the car
Rear pressure bulkhead, an airtight structural feature of an aircraft

Other uses
Bulkhead, Ohio, United States, an unincorporated community
Bulkhead (Transformers), the name given to several fictional characters in the Transformers universes
Bulkhead line, a method of coastal demarcation used within a legal system
Bulkhead (stability pattern), a stability pattern used to protect distributed software applications